Porost  (German Porst) is a village in the administrative district of Gmina Bobolice, within Koszalin County, West Pomeranian Voivodeship, in north-western Poland.

The village has a population of 360.

See also
History of Pomerania

References

Porost